Ateneh Faghih Nasiri (born 14 November 1968) is an Iranian actress. She is best known for playing the title role in the TV series Khaleh Sara (Aunt Sara) and her portrayal of Leili in the popular TV show Khaneye Sabz (The Green House).

Personal life
Faghih Nasiri was born in Tehran and spent her childhood in various cities around Iran because of her father's job. She was married to Iranian actor Fariborz Arabnia until their divorce in 1999.

In April 2019, Faghih Nasiri announced that she has been diagnosed with Multiple sclerosis.

Television

See also 
Iranian cinema

References

1968 births
Living people
People from Tehran
Actresses from Tehran
Iranian film actresses
Iranian television actresses
Islamic Azad University alumni
People with multiple sclerosis